Sebastian Fischer may refer to:
 Sebastian Fischer (actor) (1928–2018), German actor
 Sebastian Fischer (footballer) (born 1987), German footballer